Tybaertiella is a genus of sheet weavers that was first described by R. Jocqué in 1979.

Species
 it contains three species:
Tybaertiella convexa (Holm, 1962) – West, Central, East Africa
Tybaertiella krugeri (Simon, 1894) – Africa
Tybaertiella peniculifera Jocqué, 1979 – Ivory Coast, Nigeria, Ethiopia

See also
 List of Linyphiidae species (Q–Z)

References

Araneomorphae genera
Linyphiidae
Spiders of Africa